Wayuunaiki is a bilingual monthly newspaper from Venezuela, published in Spanish and Wayuu, with an emphasis on news related to the Wayuu people and other aboriginal peoples of Venezuela and Colombia.

Founded in 2000, Wayuunaiki is distributed in Venezuela and Colombia, especially in those regions where the Wayuu people reside. Its founder and current director is Jayariyú Farías Montiel. In 2010, the newspaper was nominated for the "IPDC-UNESCO Prize for Rural Communication", and was awarded fourth place.

References

External links
Wayuunaiki newspaper website
Newspapers established in 2000
2000 establishments in Venezuela
Newspapers published in Venezuela
Bilingual newspapers
Mass media in Colombia
Indigenous mass media
Wayuu language
Monthly newspapers